Park Young-soon (born 9 August 1985) is a South Korean-born professional hockey player who participated in the 2006 Women's Hockey World Cup in Madrid, Spain playing for South Korea.

References

Living people
1985 births
Field hockey players at the 2006 Asian Games
South Korean female field hockey players
21st-century South Korean women